Acacia purpurea is a species of legume in the family Fabaceae.
It is found only in Mozambique.

References
 World Conservation Monitoring Centre 1998.  Acacia purpurea.   2006 IUCN Red List of Threatened Species.   Downloaded on 18 July 2007.

purpurea
Flora of Mozambique
Vulnerable plants
Endemic flora of Mozambique
Taxa named by Carl Bolle
Taxonomy articles created by Polbot